Carmel Presbyterian Church in Natchez, Mississippi, also known as Carmel Church, was built in 1855.  It was listed on the National Register of Historic Places in 1985 and designated a Mississippi Landmark in 1996.

References

Churches on the National Register of Historic Places in Mississippi
Churches completed in 1855
19th-century Presbyterian church buildings in the United States
Mississippi Landmarks
Churches in Natchez, Mississippi
1855 establishments in Mississippi
National Register of Historic Places in Natchez, Mississippi
Greek Revival church buildings in Mississippi